Maine Department of Education is the state department of education in the U.S. state of Maine. It is headquartered in the Burton Cross State Office Building in Augusta.

The Maine Department of Education is responsible for Maine's public education.

History 
From 1854-1913 the Department was mostly a one person operation. The Maine board of education was formally constituted on 1949 and legislation soon increased the size of the Department. 

The state has debated state and federal funding of public education. In 2004 voters approved  a measure requiring the state to pay for 55% of the cost of education. In 2016 voters approved the Maine Question 2 ballot measure to tax income earners over $200,000 to fund public education, but this was not implemented. The state will fund 55% for the 2022 fiscal year.

References

External links
Official website
Maine Department of Education Higher Education
History of Education in Maine

Public education in Maine
Education
State departments of education of the United States